The Salavat constituency (No.7) is a Russian legislative constituency in Bashkortostan. The constituency covers southern Bashkiria.

Members elected

Election results

1993

|-
! colspan=2 style="background-color:#E9E9E9;text-align:left;vertical-align:top;" |Candidate
! style="background-color:#E9E9E9;text-align:left;vertical-align:top;" |Party
! style="background-color:#E9E9E9;text-align:right;" |Votes
! style="background-color:#E9E9E9;text-align:right;" |%
|-
|style="background-color:"|
|align=left|Akhmetgali Galiyev
|align=left|Independent
|
|28.40%
|-
|style="background-color:"|
|align=left|Nikolay Pavlov
|align=left|Independent
| -
|25.18%
|-
| colspan="5" style="background-color:#E9E9E9;"|
|- style="font-weight:bold"
| colspan="3" style="text-align:left;" | Total
| 
| 100%
|-
| colspan="5" style="background-color:#E9E9E9;"|
|- style="font-weight:bold"
| colspan="4" |Source:
|
|}

1995

|-
! colspan=2 style="background-color:#E9E9E9;text-align:left;vertical-align:top;" |Candidate
! style="background-color:#E9E9E9;text-align:left;vertical-align:top;" |Party
! style="background-color:#E9E9E9;text-align:right;" |Votes
! style="background-color:#E9E9E9;text-align:right;" |%
|-
|style="background-color:"|
|align=left|Rasul Shugurov
|align=left|Communist Party
|
|28.68%
|-
|style="background-color:"|
|align=left|Vener Sakhautdinov
|align=left|Independent
|
|24.18%
|-
|style="background-color:"|
|align=left|Khalil Barlybayev
|align=left|Our Home – Russia
|
|20.98%
|-
|style="background-color:"|
|align=left|Boris Shcherbakov
|align=left|Liberal Democratic Party
|
|10.26%
|-
|style="background-color:#0032A0"|
|align=left|Viktor Shingarov
|align=left|Cause of Peter the First
|
|5.70%
|-
|style="background-color:"|
|align=left|Rinat Sultanov
|align=left|Yabloko
|
|4.11%
|-
|style="background-color:#000000"|
|colspan=2 |against all
|
|4.50%
|-
| colspan="5" style="background-color:#E9E9E9;"|
|- style="font-weight:bold"
| colspan="3" style="text-align:left;" | Total
| 
| 100%
|-
| colspan="5" style="background-color:#E9E9E9;"|
|- style="font-weight:bold"
| colspan="4" |Source:
|
|}

1999

|-
! colspan=2 style="background-color:#E9E9E9;text-align:left;vertical-align:top;" |Candidate
! style="background-color:#E9E9E9;text-align:left;vertical-align:top;" |Party
! style="background-color:#E9E9E9;text-align:right;" |Votes
! style="background-color:#E9E9E9;text-align:right;" |%
|-
|style="background-color:#3B9EDF"|
|align=left|Khalil Barlybayev
|align=left|Fatherland – All Russia
|
|56.32%
|-
|style="background-color:"|
|align=left|Rasul Shugurov (incumbent)
|align=left|Communist Party
|
|21.13%
|-
|style="background-color:"|
|align=left|Dmitry Khrustalev
|align=left|Yabloko
|
|9.74%
|-
|style="background-color:"|
|align=left|Ildar Isangulov
|align=left|Russian All-People's Union
|
|3.60%
|-
|style="background-color:#000000"|
|colspan=2 |against all
|
|7.00%
|-
| colspan="5" style="background-color:#E9E9E9;"|
|- style="font-weight:bold"
| colspan="3" style="text-align:left;" | Total
| 
| 100%
|-
| colspan="5" style="background-color:#E9E9E9;"|
|- style="font-weight:bold"
| colspan="4" |Source:
|
|}

2003

|-
! colspan=2 style="background-color:#E9E9E9;text-align:left;vertical-align:top;" |Candidate
! style="background-color:#E9E9E9;text-align:leftt;vertical-align:top;" |Party
! style="background-color:#E9E9E9;text-align:right;" |Votes
! style="background-color:#E9E9E9;text-align:right;" |%
|-
| style="background-color: " |
|align=left|Kamilya Davletova
|align=left|United Russia
|
|47.92%
|-
|style="background-color:"|
|align=left|Rasul Shugurov
|align=left|Communist Party
|
|8.30%
|-
|style="background-color:"|
|align=left|Khalil Barlybayev (incumbent)
|align=left|Independent
|
|7.00%
|-
|style="background-color:"|
|align=left|Aleksandr Agafonov
|align=left|Independent
|
|6.62%
|-
|style="background-color:"|
|align=left|Airat Dilmukhametov
|align=left|Independent
|
|4.95%
|-
|style="background-color:"|
|align=left|Ildar Isangulov
|align=left|Independent
|
|4.88%
|-
|style="background-color:"|
|align=left|Dmitry Khrustalev
|align=left|Yabloko
|
|3.22%
|-
|style="background-color:#7C73CC"|
|align=left|Yazar Utarbayev
|align=left|Great Russia – Eurasian Union
|
|2.03%
|-
|style="background-color:#164C8C"|
|align=left|Yekaterina Kaftunova
|align=left|United Russian Party Rus'
|
|1.60%
|-
|style="background-color:"|
|align=left|Fanil Nurgalin
|align=left|Independent
|
|1.23%
|-
|style="background-color:"|
|align=left|Azamat Saitov
|align=left|Independent
|
|1.21%
|-
|style="background-color:"|
|align=left|Gilmitdin Kildibayev
|align=left|Agrarian Party
|
|0.86%
|-
|style="background-color:#00A1FF"|
|align=left|Nil Ishemgulov
|align=left|Party of Russia's Rebirth-Russian Party of Life
|
|0.82%
|-
|style="background-color:"|
|align=left|Rafail Yelkibayev
|align=left|Rodina
|
|0.56%
|-
|style="background-color:#000000"|
|colspan=2 |against all
|
|5.80%
|-
| colspan="5" style="background-color:#E9E9E9;"|
|- style="font-weight:bold"
| colspan="3" style="text-align:left;" | Total
| 
| 100%
|-
| colspan="5" style="background-color:#E9E9E9;"|
|- style="font-weight:bold"
| colspan="4" |Source:
|
|}

2016

|-
! colspan=2 style="background-color:#E9E9E9;text-align:left;vertical-align:top;" |Candidate
! style="background-color:#E9E9E9;text-align:leftt;vertical-align:top;" |Party
! style="background-color:#E9E9E9;text-align:right;" |Votes
! style="background-color:#E9E9E9;text-align:right;" |%
|-
| style="background-color: " |
|align=left|Zarif Baiguskarov
|align=left|United Russia
|
|55.34%
|-
|style="background-color:"|
|align=left|Rail Sarbayev
|align=left|A Just Russia
|
|16.31%
|-
|style="background-color:"|
|align=left|Yunir Kutluguzhin
|align=left|Communist Party
|
|13.78%
|-
|style="background-color:"|
|align=left|Aigul Akhmetyanova
|align=left|Liberal Democratic Party
|
|5.44%
|-
|style="background-color:"|
|align=left|Nina Ramazanova
|align=left|Communists of Russia
|
|2.09%
|-
|style="background-color:"|
|align=left|Olga Sapozhnikova
|align=left|Patriots of Russia
|
|1.62%
|-
|style="background-color:"|
|align=left|Radis Gumerov
|align=left|Rodina
|
|1.44%
|-
|style="background-color:"|
|align=left|Boris Makhov
|align=left|The Greens
|
|1.13%
|-
|style="background-color:"|
|align=left|Pavel Mashko
|align=left|Party of Growth
|
|0.95%
|-
| colspan="5" style="background-color:#E9E9E9;"|
|- style="font-weight:bold"
| colspan="3" style="text-align:left;" | Total
| 
| 100%
|-
| colspan="5" style="background-color:#E9E9E9;"|
|- style="font-weight:bold"
| colspan="4" |Source:
|
|}

2021

|-
! colspan=2 style="background-color:#E9E9E9;text-align:left;vertical-align:top;" |Candidate
! style="background-color:#E9E9E9;text-align:left;vertical-align:top;" |Party
! style="background-color:#E9E9E9;text-align:right;" |Votes
! style="background-color:#E9E9E9;text-align:right;" |%
|-
|style="background-color: " |
|align=left|Zarif Baiguskarov (incumbent)
|align=left|United Russia
|
|64.50%
|-
|style="background-color:"|
|align=left|Ilgiz Suyundukov
|align=left|Communist Party
|
|13.34%
|-
|style="background-color:"|
|align=left|Nina Ramazanova
|align=left|Communists of Russia
|
|4.30%
|-
|style="background-color:"|
|align=left|Rafael Kharisov
|align=left|A Just Russia — For Truth
|
|3.82%
|-
|style="background-color: "|
|align=left|Rustem Akhtamyanov
|align=left|Party of Pensioners
|
|3.52%
|-
|style="background-color:"|
|align=left|Sergey Zubakov
|align=left|The Greens
|
|3.36%
|-
|style="background-color:"|
|align=left|Maksim Vlasenko
|align=left|Liberal Democratic Party
|
|3.11%
|-
|style="background-color:"|
|align=left|Dmitry Kolesnikov
|align=left|Party of Growth
|
|1.56%
|-
|style="background-color:"|
|align=left|Vyacheslav Levkovich
|align=left|Rodina
|
|0.97%
|-
| colspan="5" style="background-color:#E9E9E9;"|
|- style="font-weight:bold"
| colspan="3" style="text-align:left;" | Total
| 
| 100%
|-
| colspan="5" style="background-color:#E9E9E9;"|
|- style="font-weight:bold"
| colspan="4" |Source:
|
|}

Notes

References 

Russian legislative constituencies
Politics of Bashkortostan